Philip Sparrdal Mantilla (born 11 August 1993) is a Swedish footballer who played for Djurgårdens IF and IFK Mariehamn as a defender.

Career
During the 2011 pre-season, he was moved up from Djurgården's youth team. Sparrdal Mantilla made his Allsvenskan debut on 23 October 2011 against Gefle IF as a substitute. On July 14, 2013 Spardal Mantilla made his starting debut in Allsvenskan against Mjällby AIF.

Spardal left IFK Mariehamn at the end of the 2018 season.

Career statistics

Honours
Veikkausliiga (1): 2016
Finnish Cup (1): 2015

Personal life
Mantilla's father is from Bucaramanga, Colombia.

References

External links

 
 

1993 births
Living people
Swedish people of Colombian descent
Swedish footballers
Association football defenders
Sweden youth international footballers
Allsvenskan players
Veikkausliiga players
Djurgårdens IF Fotboll players
IFK Mariehamn players
Swedish expatriate footballers
Expatriate footballers in Finland
Swedish expatriate sportspeople in Finland
Footballers from Stockholm